Gumina is a genus of sea snails, marine gastropod mollusks in the family Pyramidellidae, the pyrams and their allies.

Species
Species within the genus Gumina include:
 Gumina dolichostoma (Suter, 1908)
 Gumina minor Laws, 1940

References

External links
 To World Register of Marine Species

Pyramidellidae
Taxa named by Harold John Finlay